Augusta Harmonie Verein, also known as the American Legion Post 262 and Grand Army of the Republic Hall, is a historic clubhouse located at Augusta, St. Charles County, Missouri. It was built in 1869, and is a 1 1/2-story, frame building with board and batten siding.  It measures approximately 35 feet wide by 95 feet deep and has a weatherboarded addition built about 1970.  Also on the property is a contributing octagonal bandstand constructed about 1890.

It was added to the National Register of Historic Places in 1995.

References

Clubhouses on the National Register of Historic Places in Missouri
Buildings and structures completed in 1869
Buildings and structures in St. Charles County, Missouri
National Register of Historic Places in St. Charles County, Missouri